To the Stars may refer to:

To the Stars (album), a 2004 album by Chick Corea Elektric Band inspired by Hubbard's novel
To the Stars (novel), a science fiction novel by L. Ron Hubbard
"To the Stars" (song), a 2011 song by Modestep
To the Stars, a song by Twilight Force
To the Stars... Demos, Odds and Ends, a 2015 American rock album by Tom DeLonge
To the Stars (trilogy), series of science fiction novels by Harry Harrison: Homeworld, Wheelworld, and Starworld
To the Stars: The Autobiography of George Takei, autobiography by actor George Takei
To the Stars (company), an entertainment, science and aerospace company founded by Tom DeLonge
To the Stars (film), a 2019 American drama film
To the Stars: Costa Rica in NASA, a 2018 book by Bruce James Callow and Ana Luisa Monge Naranjo